Thill, also known as Thill Sharif or Thil, is a village in Jhelum District, Punjab, Pakistan. It is located at 32°42'0N'  73°20'0E with an altitude of 279 metres (918 feet). It is situated between the Jhelum River and Pind Dadan Khan Tehsil. Thill is located near the mountain range where the Khewra Salt Mines are located.

Geography 
Thill Sharif is bordered by mountains to the north, Pindi Saidpur to the south, Awanpur to the east, and Daulatpur to the west. Thill Sharif is surrounded by Sofi shrines. Thill is located in the Salt Range. The Khewra Salt Mines (کھیوڑہ) are nearby. The immediate area is flat and good for cultivation. Water is the main problem, as the salt in the nearby mountains has a bad effect on it. On the east side of the village there is a shrine of Baba Rata Watha (Red Stone). People rub the red stone on their joints to relieve pain. On the west side of the village the tomb of Syed Shahabul Shah Al Hussaini Al Airije Hamdani Shaheed (شھابل شاہ) is located. People used to go there for prayers to recover from skin problems. To the north, there is the shrine of Bawa Rodo (باوہ روڈو). To the south there is the shrine of Baba Jhara Wala (باوہ جھاڑا والا ). Families from Rajput (راجپوت) would traditionally go there after marriage, because he is the eldest of all Janjua Rajput (جنجوعہ راجپوت) family.

Nearby towns 
Pindi Saidpur ( پنڈی سیدپر) is the nearest large town. The people of Thill and surrounding villages go there for basic services such as food, medicine, doctors, school, and transportation. Jalalpur Sharif, also nearby, is historically significant, as Alexander The Great camped there before the Battle of the Hydaspes against King Porus in 326 BC. Pinan Wal is a major town as well.

Directions and nearest cities 
Local transport vans and buses operate between Jhelum and Pind Dadan Khan, and can be used to reach Thill.  The distance from Jhelum city to Thill is 66 km and from Pind Dadan Khan 32 km.  The village is 40 km traveling from the M2 Motorway 2 From the Lilla (للا) interchange. Thill is 200 km from Islamabad.  The nearest city is Jhelum District, Rawalpindi, Sargodha.

Climate 
Thill enjoys all four seasons. Summer is long and hot and winter is very cold. Due to the village's position in the mountains, very strong winds blow much of the time, affecting the lifestyle, and increasing the severity of poor weather. During the Monsoon, heavy rainfall is experienced in the village & good view of water fall during rain. Rain water is very helpful for cultivation. Summer days are very long and hot, so people stay in their homes or under the trees, and take their cattle under the trees as well.

Education 
In village the Punjab government education system is followed. There is no co-education in the schools. For boys the school is up to primary level (grades one through eight), for girls the school is for up to both primary and middle level (grades one through eight). After successfully finishing study in the village, boys and girls go to Pindi Saidpur by bicycle for further education. Pindi Saidpur also has no co-education, so boys and girls attend separate schools to the high school level (grades up to ten), leading to the Secondary School Certificate. All schools run under the Rawalpindi Education Board. Islamic education is a requirement at all levels of education all over the Pakistan. Some children go to Mosque as well to learn and read the Al-Quran and receive other basic Islamic education. Recently the education system in the village was not up to this level, so people had to attend school and college in Jalalpur Sharief, Pind Dadan Khan and Jhelum. The village has produced doctors, engineers, army officers, teachers, and IT professionals who serve in Pakistan, UAE, KSA and Europe.

Health 
In recent years the Punjab Governmenthas founded a small dispensary where a Doctor with two nurses perform their duties. The doctor only gives basic health care services. The nearest hospital is the Civil Hospital in Jalalpur Sharief, which gives free service for everyone; and the Fauji Foundation Hospital in Dariala Jalap, which give services to all, but is free only for those who served in the Armed Forces and their families.

Herbals 
Bhakir بھکڑ, khanaree کنیری, Grofpan گورف پان, Reten Jot رتن جوت, Charata چریتا., Ganglie Jawan,

Crops 
Crops grown in the area include Wheat, Potato, Pearl Millet, Sesame, chickpeas, mustard and other grains. The most common tree is kiker کیکر. Its wood is used to make fires and for construction. Other trees include sheesham شیشم, phullah پھلاہ, and berry بیری.

Livestock
One of the best farms in the region is maintained and owned by Raja Shaukat Hayat Janjua. Currently this farm has 40 cows and its production reached 120 L so far and planned to extend it to 200 L. Animals may roam free, and two veterinarians keep them healthy. The farm has its own dairy product outlet in Pindi Saidpur, known as Thill Dairy & Bakers.

References

Populated places in Jhelum District